Sarathiel or Serathiel is an angel in Oriental Orthodox church angelology, especially in the Coptic Orthodox Church, and is often included in lists as being one of the Seven Archangels.

See also
 List of angels in theology

References

Oriental Orthodoxy
Archangels
Individual angels
Christian terminology